RCW 38 is an HII region containing a massive star cluster located approximately 5,500 light years away from Earth in the direction of the constellation Vela (known as the Sails). The stars were very recently formed, and are still enshrouded within the dark cloud in which they were born. The star cluster is surrounded by clouds of brightly glowing gas and is composed of several short-lived massive stars, hundreds of young stars, and many protostars.

The star cluster several O-type stars with masses much larger than the sun. When these stars die, likely before the dispersal of the cluster, they will explode as supernovae.

RCW 38 includes Gum 22, Gum 23, and Gum 24.

Star Cluster 
Observations by the Chandra X-ray Observatory have revealed more than 800 X-ray emitting young stellar objects in the cluster.

The star cluster was also observed during testing of the HAWK-I camera, which revealed many details within the cluster that previously were obscured.

Gallery

References

Vela (constellation)
Open clusters
Star-forming regions